Bernard Davis is a Canadian politician, who was elected to the Newfoundland and Labrador House of Assembly in the 2015 provincial election. He represents the electoral district of Virginia Waters-Pleasantville as a member of the Liberal Party. He previously served on the St. John's City Council, having run unsuccessfully in 2008 and 2009, before being elected in 2013.

On November 8, 2018, Davis was appointed Minister of Advanced Education, Skills and Labour in the Ball government.

Davis was re-elected in the 2019 provincial election defeating Crosbie in a re-match.

On September 6, 2019, he was appointed Minister of Tourism, Culture, Industry and Innovation following a cabinet shuffle.

On August 19, 2020, Davis was reappointed to cabinet in the Furey government. His former department of Minister of Tourism, Culture, Industry and Innovation was reconfigured as the Department of Tourism, Culture, Arts, and Recreation.

Davis was re-elected in the 2021 provincial election. On April 8, 2021, he was appointed Minister of Environment and Climate Change.

References

Living people
Liberal Party of Newfoundland and Labrador MHAs
Members of the Executive Council of Newfoundland and Labrador
St. John's, Newfoundland and Labrador city councillors
21st-century Canadian politicians
Year of birth missing (living people)